In Norse mythology, the goddess Rán and the jötunn Ægir both personify the sea, and together they have nine daughters who personify waves. Each daughter's name reflects poetic terms for waves. The sisters are attested in the Poetic Edda, compiled in the 13th century from earlier traditional sources; the Prose Edda, composed in the 13th century; and in the poetry of skalds. Scholars have theorized that these daughters may be the same figures as the nine mothers of the god Heimdallr.

Names
The names of Ægir and Rán's daughters occur commonly in Old Norse sources. Lists of their names appear twice in Skáldskaparmál, a section of the Prose Edda (for detail, see Prose Edda section below).

Attestations

Poetic Edda
References to the waves as 'Ægir's daughters' appear in the Poetic Edda. The poem Helgakviða Hundingsbana I describes how the hero Helgi's boat crashes through intense seas, in doing so referencing Rán, Ægir, and their daughters as personifications of the sea. For example, two sequential stanzas reference the wave daughters:
Once the longships regrouped, only
Kolga's sisters could be heard crashing.
a sound as if swells and bluffs were bursting.

Helgi had the high sails heightened,
the unfailing crew rallying through
the rollers, Ægir's dreaded daughters trying
to overthrow their stay-bridled sea-steeds.

Prose Edda
The daughters are mentioned several times in the Prose Edda. Section 25 of Skáldskaparmál ("How shall sea be referred to?") collects manners in which poets may refer to the sea, including "husband of Ran" and "land of Ran and of Ægir's daughters", but also "father of Ægir's daughters". The section contains the first of two instances of a list of the wave daughters (for discussion regarding their names, see Name section above).

In chapter 61 of the Nafnaþulur subsection of Skáldskaparmál, the author again recounts the names of the nine daughters with a slight variation (here Dröfn is replaced with Bára).

Scholarly reception and interpretation

Some scholars have linked the Nine Daughters of Ægir and Rán with the Nine Mothers of Heimdallr, an identification that would mean that Heimdallr was thus born from the waves of the sea. However, this connection has been questioned on the grounds that the names presented for the Nine Daughters of Ægir and Rán and the Nine Mothers of Heimdallr (as listed in Völuspá hin skamma) do not match. Scholar John Lindow comments that the identification of Heimdallr's mothers as Ægir and Rán's daughters do, however, match on the grounds that Ægir and Rán's daughters, like Heimdallr's mothers, are sisters, and that two separate traditions about Heimdallr's mothers may explain the differences between the two.

See also
 Children of Lir, children of the personified sea in Irish folklore
 Rhinemaidens, characters from Richard Wagner's opera cycle Der Ring des Nibelungen

Notes

References

 Dodds, Jeramy. Trans. 2014. The Poetic Edda. Coach House Books. 
 Faulkes, Anthony. Trans. 1995 [1989]. Edda. Everyman. 
 Lindow, John. 2002. Norse Mythology: A Guide to the Gods, Heroes, Rituals, and Beliefs. Oxford University Press. 
 Orchard, Andy. 1997. Dictionary of Norse Myth and Legend. Cassell. 
 Simek, Rudolf. 2007 [1993]. Translated by Angela Hall. Dictionary of Northern Mythology. D.S. Brewer. 

Female supernatural figures in Norse mythology
Fictional nonets
Personifications in Norse mythology
Water waves